Hypsioma rimosa is a species of beetle in the family Cerambycidae. It was described by Dillon and Dillon in 1945. It is known from Paraguay.

References

rimosa
Beetles described in 1945